West Lake is the biggest freshwater lake of Hanoi, Vietnam, located northwest of the city center. With a shore length of 17 km (about 10.6 miles) and 500 hectare (about 5 km2) in area, this is the largest lake of the capital and a popular place for recreation with many surrounding gardens, hotels and villas. A small part of West Lake is divided by Thanh Niên road to form Trúc Bạch Lake. Most of the lake is located within Tây Hồ District, named after the lake.

History 
West Lake was created from a curved part of Red River and appeared in several Vietnamese legends. One legend suggests that West Lake was shaped after the battle between Lạc Long Quân and a nine-tailed fox spirit, and that's why the lake was once called "Fox Corpse Swamp". Another folk story claimed that original name of the lake was "Golden Buffalo Lake" (or Hán Việt: Hồ Kim Ngưu) because it was formed from struggle of a buffalo after the disappearance of her calf. In the 11th century, the lake was named "Foggy Lake" (Hán Việt: Hồ Dâm Đàm) due to its misty condition. Ultimately its name was changed to "West Lake" in 1573 to avoid the given name of Emperor Lê Thế Tông, which was Duy Đàm.

West Lake is bordered by many significant places in the history of Hanoi and Vietnam. Trấn Quốc Pagoda, an ancient Buddhist temple in Vietnam, was built in the 6th century by Emperor Lý Nam Đế and is located on a small island in the middle of the lake. Near Trấn Quốc Pagoda is Quán Thánh Temple, one of the Four Sacred Temples of ancient Hanoi. Chu Văn An High School, one of the oldest high schools in Vietnam, is also located close to the lake.

Recreation activities 
As Hanoi's largest lake, located right in the center of Hanoi, West Lake is abundant with gardens, hotels, restaurants and other entertainment centers. For this reason, real estate prices near West Lake are staggering, and the surrounding quarters are often full of many imposingly large edifices occupied by wealthy Vietnamese people and expatriates.

References 

 

Lakes of Hanoi
Tourist attractions in Hanoi
Hong River
Lakes of Vietnam